Satalkheri is a census town in Kota District in the Indian state of Rajasthan.

Demographics
 India census, Satalkheri had a population of 14,965. Males constitute 53% of the population and females 47%. Satalkheri has an average literacy rate of 49%, lower than the national average of 59.5%: male literacy is 63%, and female literacy is 33%. In Satalkheri, 21% of the population is under 6 years of age.

References

Cities and towns in Kota district